Sergio Maggini (14 February 1920 – 5 April 2021) was an Italian road bicycle racer who competed professionally between 1945 and 1951, together with his younger brother Luciano.

Major results

1944
1st Coppa del Re
1945
1st Coppa Bernocchi
2nd Trofeo Matteotti
3rd Road race, National Road Championships
1946
1st Gran Piemonte
2nd Giro dell'Emilia
2nd Gran Premio Industria e Commercio di Prato
9th Giro di Toscana
1947
1st Gran Premio Industria e Commercio di Prato
1st Trofeo Baracchi
2nd Coppa Bernocchi
3rd Milan-San Remo
7th Giro dell'Emilia
1948
1st Milano–Torino
3rd Giro di Toscana
6th Milan-San Remo
10th Giro di Romagna
1949
1st Stage 2 Giro d'Italia
1951
7th Milan-San Remo
7th Giro di Toscana

References

External links

1920 births
2021 deaths
Italian male cyclists
Italian centenarians
Men centenarians
Italian Giro d'Italia stage winners
Sportspeople from the Province of Prato
Cyclists from Tuscany
People from Quarrata